The following lists events that happened during 1977 in New Zealand.

Population
 Estimated population as of 31 December: 3,166,400
 Increase since 31 December 1976: 3000 (0.09%)
 Males per 100 females: 99.4

Incumbents

Regal and viceregal
Head of State – Elizabeth II
Governor-General – Sir Denis Blundell GCMG GCVO KBE QSO, followed by The Rt Hon. Sir Keith Holyoake KG GCMG CH QSO.

Government
1977 was the second full year of the 38th Parliament. The Third National Government was in power.
Speaker of the House – Roy Jack.
Prime Minister – Robert Muldoon
Deputy Prime Minister – Brian Talboys.
Minister of Finance – Robert Muldoon.
Minister of Foreign Affairs – Brian Talboys.
Attorney-General – Peter Wilkinson.
Chief Justice — Sir Richard Wild

Parliamentary opposition
 Leader of the Opposition –  Bill Rowling (Labour).

Main centre leaders
Mayor of Auckland – Dove-Myer Robinson
Mayor of Hamilton – Bruce Beetham then Ross Jansen
Mayor of Wellington – Michael Fowler
Mayor of Christchurch – Hamish Hay
Mayor of Dunedin – Jim Barnes then Clifford George (Cliff) Skeggs

Events
 5 January – Led by Joe Hawke, members of Ngati Whatua occupy Bastion Point reserve (Takaparawha) to protest crown sales of land taken from Māori.
 6 February – Silver Jubilee of Elizabeth II's accession as Queen of New Zealand
 21 November – God Defend New Zealand becomes the second official national anthem of New Zealand, in conjunction with God Save The Queen.
 6 December – The meat pie-based fast food chain Georgie Pie opens its first restaurant in Kelston, Auckland.
 23 December – the Wild Animal Control Act 1977 passed into law
 New Zealand proclaims an Exclusive Economic Zone of 200 nautical miles (370 km) – the seventh largest in the world at 4.3 million km2
 The new Executive Wing of the New Zealand Parliament, nicknamed the "Beehive" due to its shape, is officially opened by Queen Elizabeth II, despite not being fully complete yet.
Mushrooms and typewriters are added to the CPI basket.

Arts and literature
Keri Hulme and Roger Hall win the Robert Burns Fellowship.

See 1977 in art, 1977 in literature

Music
The New Zealand Music Awards were not held this year.
 Waikino music festival at Bicknel's farm, Waitawheta Valley, between Waihi and Waikino. Attendance 5500.

See: 1977 in music

Radio and television
April: Fair Go airs for the first time.
June: Wellington's Radio Active 89FM first hits the airwaves
Feltex Television Awards:
Best Current Affairs: 'News at TenBest Documentary Series: Black FutureBest Light Entertainment: BlertaBest Play: The God BoyBest Drama: MoynihanBest Speciality: Country CalendarBest Actor: Ian Mune in Winners and Losers and MoynihanBest Actress: Judy Douglas in The God BoyBest Script: The God BoyBest Personality: Roger Gascoigne

Performing arts

 Benny Award presented by the Variety Artists Club of New Zealand to Max Cryer.
Roger Hall's Middle-Age Spread'' premiered at the Circa Theatre, Wellington

Television

See: 1977 in New Zealand television, 1977 in television, List of TVNZ television programming, :Category:Television in New Zealand, :Category:New Zealand television shows, Public broadcasting in New Zealand

Film
Landfall
Off the Edge
Sleeping Dogs
Solo
Wild Man

See: :Category:1977 film awards, 1977 in film, List of New Zealand feature films, Cinema of New Zealand, :Category:1977 films

Sport

Athletics
 Terry Manners wins his second national title in the men's marathon, clocking 2:20:40 in Hawera.

Association football
 New Zealand National Soccer League won by North Shore United
 The Chatham Cup is won by Nelson United who beat Mount Wellington 1–0 in the final.

Chess
 The 84th New Zealand Chess Championship is held in North Shore, and is won by Ortvin Sarapu of Auckland.

Horse racing

Harness racing
 New Zealand Trotting Cup: Sole Command
 There was no 1977 running of the Auckland Trotting Cup as the race was being rescheduled from December (1976) to February (1978)

Thoroughbred racing

Births
 22 January: Jono Gibbes, rugby player
 25 February: Matthew Bell, cricketer
 25 March: Brooke Walker, cricketer
 16 May: Melanie Lynskey, actress
 20 May: Raf de Gregorio, soccer player
 25 May: Michael Bevin, field hockey goalkeeper
 9 July (in South Africa): Leana du Plooy, netball player
 5 July: Dale Rasmussen, rugby player
 11 July: Matai Smith, television presenter
 13 July: Xavier Rush, rugby player
 5 September: Emily Gillam, field hockey player
 8 September: Sheryl Scanlan, netball player
 9 September: Caleb Ralph, rugby player
 13 November: Chanel Cole, musician
 28 November: Greg Somerville, rugby player
 15 December: Dominic Bowden, television presenter
 21 December: Leon MacDonald, rugby player
:Category:1977 births

Deaths
 22 January: Toby Hill, watersider and trade unionist
 18 February: Ron Jarden, rugby player.
 7 June (in England): Sir Rex Nan Kivell, art collector.
 15 August: Margaret Escott, novelist and poet.
 24 December: Sir Roy Jack, politician and 16th Speaker of the House of Representatives.

See also
List of years in New Zealand
Timeline of New Zealand history
History of New Zealand
Military history of New Zealand
Timeline of the New Zealand environment
Timeline of New Zealand's links with Antarctica

References

External links

 
New Zealand
Years of the 20th century in New Zealand